Hoplopteron alifera is a species of sea snail, a marine gastropod mollusk in the family Eulimidae. This species, along with Hoplopteron terquemi, belongs in the genus, Hoplopteron.

References

External links
 To World Register of Marine Species

Eulimidae
Gastropods described in 1925